Acrachne is a genus of Asian, African, and Australian plants in the grass family. Species in the genus are commonly known as goosegrass.

 Species
 Acrachne henrardiana (Bor.) S.M. Phillips – Tamil Nadu
 Acrachne perrieri (A.Camus) S.M. Phillips – Madagascar
 Acrachne racemosa (B.Heyne ex Roem. & Schult) Ohwi – tropical and southern Africa, tropical Asia, northern Australia

 formerly included
see Eragrostis 
 Acrachne vatovae – Eragrostis vatovae

See also
 List of Poaceae genera

References

Chloridoideae
Poaceae genera